Hans Johansson may refer to:
 Hans Johansson (bandy) (born 1962), Swedish former bandy player
 Hans Johansson (equestrian) (1927–2012), Swedish equestrian
 Hans Johansson (footballer) (born 1964), Swedish former footballer
 Hans Johansson (Djurgårdens IF Fotboll footballer), Swedish former footballer
 Hans Johansson (Djurgårdens IF Fotboll footballer 1971), Swedish former footballer